Briana Buckmaster (born July 15, 1982) is a Canadian actress and singer best known for her portrayal of Donna Hanscum in Supernatural. She released her debut album, Begin, in 2018.

Early life 
Buckmaster was born in Moose Jaw, Saskatchewan. She attended Grant MacEwan University where she received her diploma in Theatre Arts.

Career

Acting 
Buckmaster is best known for her portrayal of the recurring character Sheriff Donna Hanscum on The CW's Supernatural in seasons 9-11 and 13–15. She was set to appear as a main cast member on the spinoff Wayward Sisters, but that show was ultimately not picked up by the network. Since 2018, she has portrayed Lil' Mama on Chip and Potato. Since 2020, she has portrayed Fretta Van Dango on Dorg Van Dango. She appeared in an episode of Kung Fu as Tamra in 2022, alongside fellow Supernatural alum Richard Speight Jr.

Theater 
She has also performed in several theater shows including On The Banks of the Nut, Vidalia, Mother of the Year, A Rocky Night For His Nibs, Witness to a Conga, The Adulteress, and Saint Albert all of which are by Stewart Lemoine of the Teatro la Quindicina theater. She was nominated for the Elizabeth Sterling Haynes Awards in 2012 for her role in The Adulteress.

Music 
She released her debut album, Begin, in 2018, which features Rob Benedict of Louden Swain and was produced by Jason Manns. The album peaked at number 3 on the Billboard Top Blues Album. She is featured on Jason Mann's Recovering with Friends 2018 album. She released a cover of Carry on Wayward Son with Billy Moran in 2019.

Personal life 
Buckmaster is married to José Rosales-Lopez. They have one daughter together.

Filmography

Film

Television

Discography 

 Begin (2018)

References

External links 
 IMDb

1982 births
Living people
Actresses from Saskatchewan
Canadian television actresses
Canadian voice actresses
MacEwan University alumni
People from Moose Jaw
21st-century Canadian actresses
21st-century Canadian women singers